The seventh season of Braxton Family Values, an American reality television series, is broadcast on WE tv. It premiered on November 5, 2020, and was primarily filmed in Atlanta, Georgia and Los Angeles, California. Its executive producers are Toni Braxton, Dan Cutforth, Jane Lipsitz, Julio Kollerbohm, Michelle Kongkasuwan, Lauren Gellert, Annabelle McDonald, and Sitarah Pendleton.

Braxton Family Values focuses on the lives of Toni Braxton and her sisters — Traci, Towanda, Trina, and Tamar,  — plus their mother, Evelyn.

Production
In early 2020, there were rumors of the show being canceled, however, Tamar and Trina both shut down the rumors with Trina stating the show would return in March.

In July 2020, Tamar cut ties with WE tv revealing she had only filmed a few episodes for the series' seventh season.

On October 2, 2020, it was announced that the seventh season would premiere on November 5, 2020.

On October 21, 2020, a trailer was released for the season which showed the family's reaction to Tamar's suicide attempt. The trailer was slammed by Tamar as disgusting and using her pain for ratings.

Episodes

References

2020 American television seasons